Vysoká is a village and municipality in Sabinov District in the Prešov Region of north-eastern Slovakia.

History
In historical records the village was first mentioned in 1278.

Geography
The municipality lies at an altitude of 348 metres and covers an area of 6.863 km². It has a population of about 150 people.

External links
Vysoká at the Statistical Office of the Slovak Republic

Villages and municipalities in Sabinov District
Šariš